Borallon is a rural locality in the Somerset Region, Queensland, Australia.

It is known for the Borallon Correctional Centre (a prison facility) located there.

History

The locality takes its name from a railway station, which was in turned named by Queensland Railway Commissioner Francis Curnow after his birthplace near St Ives in Cornwall, England.

Borallon Post Office opened on 1 July 1927 (a receiving office had been open from 1922) and closed in 1974.

References

External links

Suburbs of Somerset Region
Localities in Queensland